Priocnemis is a genus of pepsine spider wasp containing around 30 species.

Species list
Priocnemis aequalis (Banks, 1919)
Priocnemis agilis (Shuckard, 1837)
Priocnemis carbonarius (Smith, 1855)
Priocnemis conformis Smith, 1876
Priocnemis confusor Wahis, 2006
Priocnemis cordivalvata Haupt, 1927
Priocnemis coriacea (Dahlbom, 1843)
Priocnemis cornica (Say, 1836)
Priocnemis crawi Harris 1987
Priocnemis enslini Haupt, 1927
Priocnemis exaltata (Fabricius, 1775)
Priocnemis fallax Verhoeff, 1922
Priocnemis fennica Wahis, 1986
Priocnemis germana (Cresson, 1867)
Priocnemis hyalinata (Fabricius, 1793)
Priocnemis minorata Banks, 1912
Priocnemis minuta (Vander Linden, 1827)
Priocnemis monachus (Smith, 1855)
Priocnemis nebulosus Dahlbom, 1843
Priocnemis notha (Cresson, 1867)
Priocnemis ordishi Harris, 1987
Priocnemis parvula (Dahlbom, 1845)
Priocnemis pellipleuris Wahis, 1998
Priocnemis perturbator (Harris, 1780)
Priocnemis pusilla Schiødte, 1837
Priocnemis schioedtei Haupt, 1927
Priocnemis susterai Haupt, 1927
Priocnemis vulgaris (Dufour, 1841)

References

Hymenoptera genera
Pepsinae
Taxa named by Jørgen Matthias Christian Schiødte